Nick Ragus may refer to:
 Nick Ragus (footballer)
 Nick Ragus (coach)